The China National Youth Games ( is a quadrennial multi-sport event for Chinese athletes under the age of twenty-one. It was first held in 1988 as the China City Games. The competition switched to be held the year before the Summer Olympics in the second edition in 1991. It has been held every four years since then and was given its current name from 2015 onwards, matching the nomenclature for the newly launched Youth Olympic Games.

The purpose of the games was to improve the performance of China's best young athletes and promote widespread involvement in sport. Teams are organised on a city or district basis – in line with the designation of Chinese cities, athletes may come from the metropolitan area or its surrounding area. There are also teams sent by national organisations, such as the People's Liberation Army Navy.

Following on from revelations of doping in China, the competition incorporated its first blood tests in the 1999 edition. This trend continued, with over 1200 out-of-competition drug tests happening as part of the 2007 City Games. One cyclist and one wushu competitor were disqualified as a result. Anti-doping educational events were also held for both athletes and coaches.

The athletics competition has provided high level performances including a women's 5000 metres world junior record by Jiang Bo in 1995, and another in the women's javelin throw by Xue Juan in 2003. It has also featured future champions in the sport, including Olympic hurdles champion Liu Xiang and world marathon champion Bai Xue.

Editions

Sports

See also 
 All-China Games
 Asian Youth Games
 National Games of China
 National Peasants' Games
 Sport in China
 Thailand National Youth Games

References

Games statistics
 People's Republic of China City Games. ET97. Retrieved on 2016-09-04.

External links
 2007 China City Games official website

China Youth
Multi-sport events in China

1988 establishments in China
Recurring sporting events established in 1988
Quadrennial sporting events
National youth sports competitions
Autumn events in China